Santa Isabel (Portuguese meaning "Saint Elizabeth") is a freguesia (civil parish) of Cape Verde. It covers the western part of the island of Boa Vista, and contains the island's capital Sal Rei. The freguesia consists of the following settlements:
 Bofarreira
 Estância de Baixo
 Povoação Velha
 Rabil (town)
 Sal Rei (city)

References

Geography of Boa Vista, Cape Verde
Parishes of Cape Verde